Walton Eugene Tinsley (22 January 1921 – 12 April 1999) was an American philatelist who was added to the Roll of Distinguished Philatelists in 1983.

References

Signatories to the Roll of Distinguished Philatelists
1921 births
1999 deaths
American philatelists